Ochlocknee is a town in Thomas County, Georgia, United States. The population was 676 at the 2010 census. The city was incorporated on January 1, 1970.

Geography

Ochlocknee is located at  (30.975409, -84.055425).

Demographics

As of the census of 2000, there were 605 people, 230 households, and 164 families residing in the town. The racial makeup of the town was 65.95% White, 32.07% African American, 0.33% Native American, 0.99% Asian, and 0.66% from two or more races.

There were 230 households, out of which 27.0% had children under the age of 18 living with them, 54.8% were married couples living together, 13.5% had a female householder with no husband present, and 28.3% were non-families. 26.1% of all households were made up of individuals, and 14.3% had someone living alone who was 65 years of age or older. The average household size was 2.61 and the average family size was 3.18.

In the town, the population was spread out, with 25.3% under the age of 18, 8.8% from 18 to 24, 27.3% from 25 to 44, 22.1% from 45 to 64, and 16.5% who were 65 years of age or older. The median age was 36 years. For every 100 females, there were 87.3 males. For every 100 females age 18 and over, there were 87.6 males.

The median income for a household in the town was $23,750, and the median income for a family was $26,696. Males had a median income of $21,442 versus $18,750 for females. The per capita income for the town was $10,112. About 23.4% of families and 27.5% of the population were below the poverty line, including 43.2% of those under age 18 and 18.9% of those age 65 or over.

Arts and culture
The city has celebrated Old South Day, a food and arts and crafts festival, every year since 1976.

References

Towns in Thomas County, Georgia
Towns in Georgia (U.S. state)